Ashby Mutumbami (born 15 November 1985) is a Zimbabwean cricketer. He made his first-class debut for Southerns cricket team in the 2006–07 Logan Cup on 3 May 2007. He is now an umpire and stood in matches in the 2016–17 Logan Cup.

References

External links
 

1985 births
Living people
Zimbabwean cricketers
Zimbabwean cricket umpires
Masvingo cricketers
Southern Rocks cricketers
Southerns (Zimbabwe) cricketers
Sportspeople from Masvingo